The LCI 367 was commissioned August 23, 1943 and decommissioned October 2, 1946. It was a landing craft flotilla ship commanded by Lieutenant Saul Charles Smiley USNR. The LCI was part of Group eleven, Flotilla four, and most notably was part of the capture and occupation of Okinawa during World War II.

History 
The ship was laid down on 26 July 1943 by George Lawley & Son shipyard in Neponset, Massachusetts.

Campaigns 
 Assault, capture and occupation of Okinawa Japan. May 14 to June 30, 1945.

Crew 
Known crewmen to have served on the LCI 367 include:
 Edward Harrison Able
 Warren Webster Dark
 Francis Xavier Fenton
 Edward Harrison Fenton
 Vasillios Emmanuel Georgiades
 William Bruce Glass
 Ray Morgan
 Andrew Joseph Milanese
 Umberto Bonosoro
 Ralph Chester Brown
 Lilton Lewis Butler
 Gertha Geroy Gannon
 Anthony Joseph Columbus
 Andrew Joseph Milanese
 Richard Joseph Gasar
 George Roy Gullion
 Robert Ellsworth Haupt
 James Hobbs
 Frederick Curtis Jewel
 Leonard Granville Marshal
 Pete Paulus
 Edward Joseph Porambo
 Harold Eugene McCauslin
 Doland James Preston
 Harry Ferguson Taylor
 Virgil Gale Whitmyer
 Charles Edward Younger
 Lt. Harris Brown

References

World War II amphibious warfare vessels
1943 ships
Ships built in Boston